Greensburg Central Catholic High School (GCC) is a Roman Catholic high school located in Greensburg, Pennsylvania, United States. It falls within the Roman Catholic Diocese of Greensburg.

History 
Construction of Greensburg Central Catholic High School began in the summer of 1958, only seven years after the founding of the Diocese of Greensburg. The first class of freshmen entered in September 1959, including students from as far east as Ligonier and as far west as Trafford and Charleroi.

Bishop Hugh L. Lamb dedicated the building on November 29, 1959, before an audience of 2,000, which included Governor David L. Lawrence as the featured speaker. This large audience was somewhat surprising given the freezing and snowy weather on the dedication day. In fact, according to the Greensburg Tribune-Review:
The former Pittsburgh mayor (Governor Lawrence) not only had to abandon his automobile on a steep grade near the school but was forced to give his address in near darkness and without the use of a public address system. The latter inconveniences occurred when an automobile went out of control, struck a utility pole ... and wrecked the power system.

At the time of Greensburg Central Catholic's founding, six Roman Catholic religious institutes provided most of the faculty. The Sisters of St. Benedict were responsible for teaching languages; the Sisters of Charity, science and music; the Felician Sisters, mathematics; the Sisters of Mercy, English; the Sisters of St. Joseph, social studies; and the Vincentian Sisters of Charity, business. Lay teachers handled physical education.

In 1962, Bishop William G. Connare proposed building a faculty house for all six religious groups, featuring a wing for each community with a common chapel (the Chapel of the Immaculate Heart of Mary), dining room, and community room. The first Mass was offered in this chapel on August 31, 1963.

The Sisters of Charity are the only remaining religious institute at Central.

Curriculum 

The school's original curriculum was primarily academic, but the school soon added a general and business course. Father Shuda, the school's third principal, urged the construction of an addition to the school, also designed by Francis O'Connor Church. The Fathers' Club and Mothers' Club (now replaced by one group, the Parents' Club) helped with furnishings and installation.

The school offers a diverse curriculum, including Advanced Placement and college credit courses, as well as business and general study courses. The school built a stadium in 1989 and installed lights in 1998 for night football and soccer games.

Campus 

2011 saw the introduction of a new Junior High program. The school housed a 7th and 8th grade for the first time in its history. The project necessitated multiple renovations to the building. The school converted former art classrooms into multi-purpose classrooms for the new grades and made the former weight room into the library; the current weight room sits where the stage used to be, next to the main gym. Although the junior and senior high schools are mostly segregated, certain high-school-level courses are available for 8th graders.

Athletics 

The athletics program at Greensburg Central Catholic is one of the most successful in the state of Pennsylvania. The school has won three state championships and countless WPIAL titles. The most successful sports program at Central is the ice hockey team, which won three state championships in the 90s and has been a state power for the past twenty years. The football program has received widespread notoriety as a result of back-to-back WPIAL championship game appearances in 2005 and 2006, before winning the WPIAL championship and appearing in the PIAA championship game. The girls' basketball program has been dominant for the past few decades, winning the section title consecutively as well as WPIAL titles and PIAA contests.  The GCC baseball team also won a Class A PIAA state championship in 2002.

Notable alumni 
Bibiana Boerio
Joe Kenda
Warren Schaeffer

Notes and references

Catholic secondary schools in Pennsylvania
Educational institutions established in 1959
Schools in Westmoreland County, Pennsylvania
Greensburg, Pennsylvania
1959 establishments in Pennsylvania